Jomin Tayeng (1 February 1944 – 7 May 2013) was  an Indian bureaucrat and politician who became the first direct recruit Officer of the Indian Administrative Service from Arunachal Pradesh in 1968.

Early life and career
In 1976 he was appointed secretary to the Chief Minister of Arunachal Pradesh. After his retirement in 2004 he joined politics and contested the  Dambuk constituency for the Legislative Assembly of Arunachal Pradesh as the INC candidate but was defeated. He contested the seat again in the 2009 election and was elected for the NCP; after the election he joined the INC.

References

1944 births
2013 deaths
Indian National Congress politicians from Arunachal Pradesh
Nationalist Congress Party politicians from Arunachal Pradesh
Arunachal Pradesh MLAs 2009–2014
People from Adi Community
People from Lower Dibang Valley district